The following outline is provided as an overview of and topical guide to golf:

Golf – precision club and ball sport, in which competing players (or golfers) use many types of clubs to hit balls into a series of holes on a golf course using the fewest strokes.

What type of thing is golf? 

Golf can be described as all of the following:

 a form of entertainment or recreation
 a game
 a ball game
 a sport
 a precision sport

Variations of golf 

 Scoring
 Stroke play
 Match play
 Stableford
 Skins game
 Formats
 Four-ball (better-ball)
 Foursome (alternate shot)
 Variations
 Long drive
 Speed golf
 Pitch and putt
 Miniature golf
 Clock golf
 Indoor golf
 Beach golf
 Snow golf
 Disc golf
 Footgolf
 Sholf
 Dart golf

History of golf 

History of golf
 Timeline of golf
 Timeline of golf history (1353–1850)
 Timeline of golf history (1851–1945)
 Timeline of golf history (1945–1999)
 Timeline of golf (2000–present)
 Golf book

Golf course 
 
Golf course
 Driving range
 Greenskeeper
 Hazards 
 Links
 Teeing ground

Golf courses around the world 

 List of golf courses in Canada
 List of golf courses in India
 List of golf courses in North Dakota
 List of golf courses in Portugal
 List of golf courses in the Philippines
 List of golf courses in the United Kingdom

Rules of golf 

Rules of golf
 Penalty
 Scoring
 Golf etiquette

Golf equipment 

Golf equipment
 Golf clubs
Wood
Putter
Iron
Wedge 
Pitching wedge
Gap wedge
Sand wedge
Lob wedge
Hybrid
Obsolete golf clubs
 Golf ball
Golf ball retriever
 Golf bag
 Golf cart
 Golf trolley
 Tee

Game play 

 Golf swing
 Drive

Golf culture 

 Caddie
 Golf instruction
 Golf mirror
 List of golf video games

Golf organizations 

 International Golf Federation
 The R&A
 United States Golf Association
 Professional Golfers' Association (Great Britain and Ireland)
 Professional Golfers' Association of America

Golf competitions 
 Grand Slam
 Men's major golf championships
 Women's major golf championships
 Senior major golf championships
 Professional tours
 LPGA
 PGA Tour
 PGA European Tour
 Team competitions
 Ryder Cup
 Presidents Cup
 Solheim Cup
 International Crown
 Seve Trophy
 EurAsia Cup
 Walker Cup
 Eisenhower Trophy
 Curtis Cup
 Espirito Santo Trophy
 Multi-sport games
 Golf at the Summer Olympics
 Golf at the Asian Games
 Golf at the Pacific Games
 Golf at the Pan American Games
 Golf at the Summer Universiade
 Golf at the Youth Olympic Games
 Rankings
 Official World Golf Ranking
 Women's World Golf Rankings
 World Amateur Golf Ranking

Golf by country 

 Golf in Australia
 Golf in China
 Golf in India
 Golf in Ireland
 Golf in the Philippines
 Golf in Russia
 Golf in Scotland
 Golf in Thailand
 Golf in the United States

Media coverage of golf

Golf on US media 

 Broadcast television partners
 PGA Tour on ABC
 PGA Tour on CBS
 Golf on Fox
 Golf Channel on NBC
 Cable television partners
 Golf on ESPN
 Fox Sports 1
 Golf Channel 
 Golf on TNT
 PGA Tour on USA
 Golf Channel
 The Big Break
 Feherty
 Fore Inventors Only
 Golf Central
 Highway 18
 Live From...
 Shell's Wonderful World of Golf
 Radio partners
 ESPN Radio
 SiriusXM PGA Tour Radio
 Personalities by network
 List of ESPN/ABC golf commentators
 List of PGA Tour on CBS commentators
 Fox USGA#Commentators
 List of Golf Channel personalities 
 List of Golf Channel on NBC commentators 
 Golf on TNT#Commentators
 PGA Tour on USA#Commentators
 Other programs
 Dan Doh!!
 Défi mini-putt
 The Golf Show
 Monday Night Golf
 The Scottish Golf Show
 Wandering Golfer
 Golf publications
 Golf Digest
 Golf Magazine
 Golf World
 Golfweek
 Links
 Travel + Leisure Golf
 List of golf video games

Persons influential in golf 

 List of male golfers
 List of female golfers
 List of men's major championships winning golfers
 List of LPGA major championship winning golfers
 List of Champions Tour major championship winning golfers
 List of golfers with most Asian Tour wins
 List of golfers with most Challenge Tour wins
 List of golfers with most European Tour wins
 List of golfers with most Japan Golf Tour wins
 List of golfers with most LPGA Tour wins
 List of golfers with most Ladies European Tour wins
 List of golfers with most PGA Tour Champions wins
 List of golfers with most PGA Tour wins
 List of golfers with most Korn Ferry Tour wins
 List of golfers with most wins in one PGA Tour event
 List of golf course architects
 List of Olympic medalists in golf

Terminology 
 Glossary of golf

See also 

 Outline of sports

References

External links 

The R&A, St Andrews
USGA: United States Golf Association
International Golf Federation (IGF)

golf
golf